Law Beyond the Range is a 1935 American Western film directed by Ford Beebe and written by Lambert Hillyer. The film stars Tim McCoy, Billie Seward, Robert Allen, Guy Usher, Harry Todd and Walter Brennan. The film was released on February 15, 1935, by Columbia Pictures.

Plot

Cast           
Tim McCoy as Tim McDonald
Billie Seward as Gloria Alexander
Robert Allen as Johnny Kane
Guy Usher as Daniel Heston
Harry Todd as Judge Avery
Walter Brennan as Abner 
Si Jenks as Zeke 
James B. 'Pop' Kenton as Pete 
Ben Hendricks Jr. as Sheriff Burke
Jules Cowles as Lockjaw Nelson

References

External links
 

1935 films
American Western (genre) films
1935 Western (genre) films
Columbia Pictures films
Films directed by Ford Beebe
1930s English-language films
1930s American films